is the debut studio album by Japanese idol duo Wink, released by Polystar on June 1, 1988. It features the duo's debut single, a Japanese-language cover of The Rubettes' "Sugar Baby Love". Also included in the album are covers of Diane Renay's "Navy Blue", The Four Seasons' "Bye, Bye, Baby (Baby Goodbye)", Orleans' "Dance with Me", and Paul Anka's "Put Your Head on My Shoulder".

The album peaked at No. 52 on Oricon's albums chart and sold over 50,000 copies.

Track listing

Charts

References

External links 
 
 
 

1988 debut albums
Wink (duo) albums
Japanese-language albums